Joseph James Davin (13 February 1942 – 30 September 2013) was a Scottish footballer, who played for Hibernian, Ipswich Town, Morton and Dumbarton.

References

1942 births
2013 deaths
Scottish footballers
Dumbarton F.C. players
Hibernian F.C. players
Greenock Morton F.C. players
Ipswich Town F.C. players
Scottish Football League players
English Football League players
Sportspeople from Dumbarton
Footballers from West Dunbartonshire
Association football fullbacks